Panufnik is a Polish surname. Notable people with the surname include:

Andrzej Panufnik (1914–1991), Polish composer and conductor
Roxanna Panufnik (born 1968), British composer, daughter of Andrzej

Polish-language surnames